Amrita Chattopadhayay is a Bengali film actress. Her debut film was Buddhadeb Dasgupta's Anwar ka Ajab Kissa After that, she acted in a number of Bengali, Hindi, and multilingual films.

Early life and education 
Amrita did her schooling at Patha Bhavan Kolkata. She graduated from St. Xaviers in sociology (with honours) and did her post-graduation studies at Jadavpur University, scoring first class marks in both cases.

Filmmaker  Buddhadeb Dasgupta's film Anwar ka Ajab Kissa marked her film debut.  It did not release theatrically. She has acted in Bengali films as the protagonist, including Janla Diye Bou Palalo and Meher Ali.

Filmography

Television and Web Series
Kanakanjali
Byomkesh Season 3 
Teen Kanya
Laboratory
Bou keno Psycho
Manbhanjan
Paanch Phoron 2 - Episode 3
Damayanti
JL50
Gangulys wed Guhas

References

External links 
 

Bengali actresses
Living people
Actresses in Bengali cinema
Actresses from Kolkata
Year of birth missing (living people)